The Twelve Monograms egg, also known as the Alexander III Portraits egg, is an Easter egg made under the supervision of the Russian jeweller Peter Carl Fabergé in 1896 for Tsar Nicholas II of Russia. It was presented by Nicholas II to his mother, the Dowager Empress Maria Feodorovna. The egg was the second Fabergé egg ever given by Nicholas II to his mother as an Easter present.

This egg is one of four commemorating Tsar Alexander III. The other three are the Empire Nephrite egg (1902), the missing Alexander III Commemorative egg (1909), and the Alexander III Equestrian Egg (1910).

It is currently held in the Hillwood Museum in Washington, D.C., as part of the Marjorie Merriweather Post Collection.

Description
Each panel of the egg contains a Cyrillic cipher of Alexander III and Maria Fedorovna, set and crowned in diamonds, set against the dark blue enamel with a design of red gold, rose-cut diamonds, portrait diamonds and velvet lining. It is covered by six panels each divided by bands set with rose-cut diamonds and decorated with the Imperial crown and Imperial monograms (MF) "Maria Fyodorovna" and (AIII) "Alexander III". Each monogram appears six times, with Maria's monogram appearing on the top half of the egg and Alexander's appearing on the bottom.

Identification
An allegedly-missing Fabergé egg known from its description as the Alexander III Portraits Egg was previously thought to be the Imperial Easter egg from 1895 in the Maria Feodorovna series.

However, following the 2012 rediscovery of the 1887 Third Imperial egg, which was announced to the world in March 2014, and the reassignment of the Blue Serpent Clock egg as the 1895 Imperial Easter egg, it became clear that the "missing" Imperial Easter egg identified in the series as the Alexander III Portraits Egg must be the extant Twelve Monograms Egg of 1896. 

The 1896 Twelve Monograms Egg is held at the Hillwood Museum in Washington, D.C.

Surprise
The surprise for this egg is missing. It is believed that this egg contained six miniatures of Alexander III painted on an ivory background and mounted with sapphires.

References

Further reading

External links

 Website by Annemiek Wintraecken: 1896 Twelve Monogram Egg / Alexander III Portraits Egg

Imperial Fabergé eggs
1896 works
Alexander III of Russia